Charles John Frazier Campbell (1862 – 1947) was the first mayor of Melbourne, Florida serving from 1888 to 1889.

He immigrated to America from Canada in 1884. He married Margaret Punnett in 1893. They had children John and Mona.

In 1916, Campbell bought the Gem Theatre from J.B. Johnston.

Campbell bought the Goode House hotel, and enlarged it to be the Bellevue Hotel. It had a cement pool and a water wheel and pulley carried the guests' luggage to the third floor. In 1920 it was renamed as the Orange Spot Inn, owned by Harry Balsley of Detroit.

He is buried at the Melbourne Cemetery.

Associations 
 Senior Warden (1921), Holy Trinity Episcopal Church, Melbourne, Florida
 Junior Warden (1942), Holy Trinity Episcopal Church, Melbourne, Florida

References 

1862 births
1947 deaths
American people of Scottish descent
English emigrants to the United States
Mayors of Melbourne, Florida
19th-century English people
19th-century American politicians
20th-century American businesspeople